Kumeyaay (Kumiai), also known as Central Diegueño, Kamia, Iipaay Aa, and Campo, is the Native American language spoken by the Kumeyaay people of southern San Diego and Imperial counties in California. Hinton (1994:28) suggested a conservative estimate of 50 native speakers of Kumeyaay. A more liberal estimate (including speakers of Ipai and Tipai), supported by the results of the Census 2000, is 110 people in the US, including 15 persons under the age of 18.  There were 377 speakers reported in the 2010 Mexican census, including 88 who called their language "Cochimi".

Kumeyaay belongs to the Yuman language family and to the Delta–California branch of that family. Kumeyaay and its neighbors, Ipai to the north and Tipai to the south, were often considered to be dialects of a single Diegueño language, but the current consensus among linguists seems to be that at least three distinct languages are present within the dialect chain (e.g., Langdon 1990). Confusingly, Kumeyaay is commonly used as a designation both for the central language of this family and for the Ipai-Kumeyaay-Tipai people as a whole. Tipai is also commonly used as a collective designation for speakers of both Kumeyaay and Tipai proper.

Documentation 
In 1999, published documentation for the Kumeyaay language appeared to be limited to a few texts.

As of May 2014, online Kumeyaay language lessons were available. A "dictionary of all five dialects of Kumeyaay spoken in Baja California" is in preparation. Kumeyaay language stories are recorded at the Kumeyaay museum in Tecate.

Phonology

Consonants

Alveolar sounds /t, s, n, r/ can also be heard as post-alveolar [t̠, s̠, n̠, r̠].

Vowels

Vowel length may also be distributed.

References

Bibliography
 Leanne Hinton. 1994. Flutes of Fire: Essays on California Indian Languages. Heyday Books, Berkeley, California.
 Langdon, Margaret. 1990. "Diegueño: how many languages?" In Proceedings of the 1990 Hokan–Penutian Languages Workshop, edited by James E. Redden, pp. 184–190. University of Southern Illinois, Carbondale.
 Mithun, Marianne. 1999. The Languages of Native North America. Cambridge University Press.

Further reading

External links 

 ELAR archive of Documentation of the Baja California Yuman Languages Kumeyaay and Ko'alh

Kumeyaay
Indigenous languages of California
Yuman–Cochimí languages
Articles citing INALI

Languages of Mexico